Capitol Hill (Former Japanese name: 中山, Nakayama; sometimes spelled Capital Hill, formerly Army Hill under the United States Navy) is a settlement (sometimes termed a village or district) on the island of Saipan in the Northern Mariana Islands. It has a population of just over 1,000. Capitol Hill has been the territory's seat of government since 1962. It lies on the cross-island road between Tanapag and San Vicente.

Capitol Hill was built in 1948 by the Central Intelligence Agency as a base for covert training of Nationalist Chinese guerrillas.

The area is home to various government departments and agencies:

 Governor's Office
 Commonwealth of the Northern Mariana Islands Legislature Building
 US Post Office 
 Commonwealth of the Northern Mariana Islands Department of Commerce
 Commonwealth of the Northern Mariana Islands Workforce Investment Agency
 Commonwealth of the Northern Mariana Islands Council for Arts and Culture

Transportation
Route 31 (Cross Island Road) or Isa Drive is the main road in the area.

Climate

See also
 List of state and territorial capitols in the United States

References

Towns and villages in the Northern Mariana Islands
Saipan
Populated places established in 1948